Abbakumovo is a rural locality (a village) in Mytishchinsky District, Moscow Oblast, Russia. The population was 102 as of 2010. There are 30 streets.

Geography 
Abbakumovo is located 28 km northwest of Mytishchi (the district's administrative centre) by road. Yeremino is the nearest rural locality.

References 

Rural localities in Moscow Oblast
Mytishchinsky District